Archbishop Carney Secondary School (ACRSS, commonly referred to as Carney) is a private Roman Catholic independent secondary school in Port Coquitlam, British Columbia. It is under charge of the Roman Catholic Archdiocese of Vancouver and is the newest Roman Catholic high school in the Lower Mainland with just under 600 registered students for the fall semester of September 2013.

History
Founded in 1994 by eight Roman Catholic parishes in the cities of Coquitlam, Port Coquitlam, Port Moody, Maple Ridge & Pitt Meadows, ACRSS had humble beginnings. In its first year, the school operated from portable classrooms on the parking lot of Our Lady of Assumption Catholic elementary school in Port Coquitlam with only 87 students.

The first wing of the permanent school was opened in September, 1995. A second wing of classrooms, expanded gymnasium and multi-purpose room were added two years later. Today, construction is underway to add the next phase; a Fine Arts wing.  Eventually the school plans to add an athletic Field House as well. The school is continuously growing, particularly in the areas of Fine Arts and Athletics. These facilities are needed to address these growing needs and provide an inspiring quality of education for Archbishop Carney's students. Approval from the Archdiocese of the field house is still required and will need the full support of the entire community in order to be achieved.

As of 2009, SMART boards have been incorporated into the classroom curriculum.

Independent school status 

Archbishop Carney is classified as a Group 1 school under British Columbia's Independent School Act. It receives 50 per cent funding from the Ministry of Education. The school receives no funding for capital costs. It is under charge of the Roman Catholic Archdiocese of Vancouver. Ultimately, this funding model means the school must rely on tuition and the generosity of its community.

Academic performance 

Archbishop Carney is ranked by the Fraser Institute. In 2017–18, it was ranked 36 out of 251 Vancouver lower mainland schools.

Student Life - Extracurricular Activities

Student Council (Starliament) 
The 1999 Constitution explains the purpose of this group:
Starliament has the responsibility to represent the interests of the student body of Archbishop Carney. They organize student activities, represents the student body to the community, promote school spirit, liaison with the staff, and promote the philosophy of the school.
The leaders of Starliament are students, they are elected by their peers.  (Leader - Prime Minister)

Clubs 
There is a wide range of clubs to choose from.  At the beginning of each year students have a chance to find what clubs they choose to join for that year.

The Tech Crew
The Tech Crew is responsible for the setup of the school's sound, lighting, and video equipment at events such as concerts, talent shows, and the monthly school masses.

Fine Arts
Archbishop Carney's music program holds large performances, including a Christmas Concert and a Spring Concert, and participation in the "Kiwanis Music Festival".  In late February the Jazz Band I, Senior Concert Band and Senior Concert Choir will be traveling to Disneyland to participate in "Magic Music Days".In the year of 2011/12 this program entered a one-act play into METfest and won 2nd place. In the same year a student made one-act play was also entered into another competition and won first. Carney puts on one full play and one musical in alternating years.

Ensembles:

Athletics
The school fields teams in the following sports:
 Basketball
 Soccer
 Swimming
 Volleyball
 Field hockey
 Golf
 Mountain biking
 Tennis
 Track and field
 Cross country

The newest additions include:
 Wrestling
 Ice hockey
 Ultimate Frisbee
 Water polo
 Badminton

References

External links
Archbishop Carney Website

Educational institutions established in 1994
High schools in British Columbia
Port Coquitlam
Private schools in British Columbia
Catholic secondary schools in British Columbia
1994 establishments in British Columbia